Blessing Mudavanhu is a Zimbabwean mathematician, corporate executive, academic, businessman and entrepreneur, who is the founder and president of Dura Capital Limited, a company that he founded in 2006, at the age of 35 years. Effective 1 June 2018, he serves as the Group CEO of CBZ Holdings, a financial services conglomerate (company) in Zimbabwe.

From January 2015 until his resignation in August 2016, he served as the Acting Group CEO of BancABC, a financial services conglomerate, with subsidiaries in six African countries.

Background and education
He was born in Zimbabwe on 26 May 1971 and attended Zimbabwean schools for his pre-university education. He studied at the University of Zimbabwe, graduating with a Bachelor of Science in mathematics. He later obtained a Master of Financial Engineering, from the University of California Berkeley. In 2002, he was awarded a Doctor of Philosophy in mathematics, from the University of Washington, which he attended on a Fulbright scholarship.

Career
Following the completion of graduate school, he joined American International Group (AIG), as a Senior Risk Analytics Associate, based in New York City. When he left AIG, he joined Bank of America Merrill Lynch as director of Global Risk Management responsible for New York City, London, Mexico City and Sao Paulo.

He joined BancABC Group in 2009, as "Group Chief Risk Officer", based in Johannesburg. In January 2015, Dr. Mudavanhu was appointed Group CEO. He resigned that position in August 2016, and resigned from BancABC Group, in January 2017.

Other responsibilities
Blessing Mudavanhu is a Visiting Senior Lecturer in the School of Computer Science and Applied Mathematics and Sessional Lecturer in the business school at the University of the Witwatersrand, in Johannesburg, South Africa. He previously served as Adjunct Professor of Risk Management in the Financial Mathematics Program at the Baruch College of the City University of New York. In August 2017, he was appointed, as a non-executive director, to the board of the Development Bank of Southern Africa, to serve a renewable three-year term.

See also
 Economy of Zimbabwe
 Economy of South Africa

References

External links
 Website of Dura Capital Limited
 Website of CBZ Holdings

Living people
1971 births
Zimbabwean bankers
Zimbabwean academics
University of Zimbabwe alumni
University of California, Berkeley alumni
Zimbabwean businesspeople
University of Washington alumni
Zimbabwean chief executives
Academic staff of the University of the Witwatersrand